Dan Evans was the defending champion but chose not to defend his title.

Jordan Thompson won the title after defeating Denis Kudla 7–5, 6–3 in the final.

Seeds

Draw

Finals

Top half

Bottom half

References

External links
Main draw
Qualifying draw

Surbiton Trophy - 1
2022 men's singles